The Chinese Ambassador to Belarus is the official representative of the People's Republic of China to Belarus.

List of representatives

References 

Belarus
China
Ambassadors